Asha G. Menon (born 25 October 1985) is a well-known Malayalam film playback singer, who is widely remembered for her first song 'Aaradyam Parayum' from the film 'Mazha' (2000). At the age of 15, she won the Kerala State Award for the Best Female Playback Singer in 2001. The song Aaradyam Parayum in the film Mazha directed by Lenin Rajendran starring Biju Menon and Samyuktha Varma won the award.
She is also popular as a TV presenter who anchored the music show on Asianet - 'Hrudayaragam' for many years.

Personal life
Asha was born in Thrissur.

References 

1985 births
Living people
Indian women playback singers
Malayalam playback singers
Singers from Thrissur
Film musicians from Kerala
21st-century Indian women singers
21st-century Indian singers